Canevino is a comune (municipality) in the Province of Pavia in the Italian region Lombardy, located about  south of Milan and about  southeast of Pavia.

Canevino borders the following municipalities: Alta Val Tidone, Montecalvo Versiggia, Rocca de' Giorgi, Ruino, Volpara.

References

External links
 Official website
 Canevino on The Campanile Project

Cities and towns in Lombardy